Ana Elisa Pérez Bolaños (born 13 June 1973) is a Mexican politician from the New Alliance Party. In 2009 he served as Deputy of the LX Legislature of the Mexican Congress representing the Federal District.

References

1973 births
Living people
Politicians from Mexico City
Women members of the Chamber of Deputies (Mexico)
New Alliance Party (Mexico) politicians
21st-century Mexican politicians
21st-century Mexican women politicians
Deputies of the LX Legislature of Mexico
Members of the Chamber of Deputies (Mexico) for Mexico City